Acrocercops melanocosma is a moth of the family Gracillariidae, known from Brazil. It was described by Edward Meyrick in 1920.

References

melanocosma
Moths of South America
Moths described in 1920